Gerald was an unincorporated community in Dale County until 1965, when the area was incorporated into the town limits of the newly formed Level Plains, Alabama, United States.

History
A post office operated under the name Gerald from 1898 to 1901. Gerald was a train whistle-stop on the Alabama Midland Railway running from Newton to Enterprise.

References

Unincorporated communities in Dale County, Alabama
Unincorporated communities in Alabama